Concert in the Egg is a painting formerly considered to be a copy of a lost work by Hieronymus Bosch, and which is currently considered to be based on one of his drawings. Max Jakob Friedländer called it 'an old copy', without specifying another work it was copied from.

Symbolism
The group of singers form the "yolk" of the egg, which symbolizes "fool" as in "yokel". The eel resembles a form of beer (ale). The scene is reminiscent of the similar Ship of Fools. One of the singers is so intent on his song (pointing towards the book) that he fails to notice that he is being robbed by the lute player.

Modern attribution of the painting (to an as yet anonymous follower of Bosch) was based on an analysis of the music in the open book, which shows notes of the chanson Toutes les nuictz by Thomas Crecquillon from 1549.
The work was bought in 1890 for 400 francs by the Palais des Beaux-Arts de Lille from Morhange, a parisian art dealer. It was featured with the Dutch title Zangers en musici in een ei in an exhibition in 2008 at the Noordbrabants Museum, 's-Hertogenbosch.

Possible models:

References

 See the Dutch Wikipedia article
 Max Jakob Friedländer Early Netherlandisch Painting. Volume V. Geertgen tot Sint Jans and Jerome Bosch, 1969, Leiden, A.W. Slijthof; Brussels, La Connaissance.
 Koldeweij, A.M., P. Vandenbroeck en B. Vermet (2001) Jheronimus Bosch. Alle schilderijen en tekeningen, Rotterdam, Museum Boijmans Van Beuningen, Rotterdam: NAi Uitgevers,

External links

Paintings by Hieronymus Bosch
16th-century paintings
Paintings in the collection of the Palais des Beaux-Arts de Lille
Birds in art
Books in art
Turtles in art
Snakes in art
Musical instruments in art